Always, Always is the third collaborative studio album by Porter Wagoner and Dolly Parton. It was  released on June 30, 1969, by RCA Victor. The album was produced by Bob Ferguson. It peaked at number five on the Billboard Top Country Albums chart and number 162 on the Billboard 200 chart. "Yours Love" and the album's title track were released as singles, peaking at numbers nine and 16, respectively.

Recording
Recording sessions for the album took place at RCA Studio B in Nashville, Tennessee, on December 3 and 20, 1968. Three additional sessions followed on April 21, 22 and 23, 1969.

Release and promotion
The album was released June 30, 1969, on LP and 8-track.

Singles
The album's first single, "Yours Love", was released in February 1969 and debuted at number 39 on the Billboard Hot Country Songs chart. It peaked at number nine on the chart dated May 10, its tenth week on the chart. It charted for 14 weeks. The second single, "Always, Always", was released in May 1969 and debuted at number 60 on the Billboard Hot Country Songs chart dated June 21. It peaked at number 16 on the chart dated July 26, its sixth week on the chart. The single spent 11 weeks on the chart.

Critical reception

The review in the July 12, 1969 issue of Billboard said, "In the tradition of the country duet, you would have to see far to find another as polished and professional as Porter Wagoner and Dolly Parton—and few of those would be as successful. Here's their hit "Always, Always", and the impactful "Yours Love". Also recommended: "I Don't Believe You've Met My Baby"."

Cashbox published a review which said, "Titled after their latest single, this talented twosome offer a powerful package loaded with listening and sales appeal. Set contains twelve oldies and newies, including "Milwaukee, Here I Come", "Why Don't You haul Off & Love Me", "There Never Was a Time", "No Reason to Hurry Home", and "Anything's Better Than Nothing". Expect instant action on this one."

AllMusic rated the album 3 out of 5 stars.

Commercial performance
The album debuted at number 35 on the Billboard Top Country Albums chart dated August 2, 1969. It peaked at number five on the chart dated September 19, its eighth week on the chart. It spent a total of 27 weeks on the chart. The album also peaked at number 162 on the Billboard Top LPs chart.

Reissues
The album was reissued on CD with 1971's Two of a Kind in 2008. It was released as a digital download on November 2, 2010. The album was included in the 2014 box set Just Between You and Me: The Complete Recordings, 1967–1976.

Track listing

Personnel
Adapted from the album liner notes and RCA recording session records.

Jean Alrshuler – harp
Joseph Babcock – backing vocals
Glenn Baxter – trumpet
David Briggs – piano
Jerry Carrigan – drums
Anita Carter – backing vocals
Bobby Dyson – bass
Dolores Edgin – backing vocals
Bob Ferguson - producer
Lloyd Green – steel
Roy M. Huskey, Jr. – bass
Little Jack Little - liner notes
Mack Magaha - fiddle, liner notes
George McCormick - rhythm guitar, liner notes
Bill McElhiney – trumpet
Wayne Moss – guitar
Al Pachucki - recording engineer
June Evelyn Page – backing vocals
Dolly Parton - lead vocals
Hargus Robbins – piano
Speck Rhodes - liner notes
Roy M. Shockley - recording technician
Jerry Stembridge – electric guitar
Buck Trent - banjo, liner notes
Porter Wagoner - lead vocals
Don Warden - liner notes
Hurshel Wiginton  – backing vocals

Charts

Release history

References

Dolly Parton albums
Porter Wagoner albums
1969 albums
Albums produced by Bob Ferguson (music)
Vocal duet albums
RCA Records albums